was a Japanese economist and politician.

Early life
Shiokawa was born in Fuse City (now Higashi-Osaka City), Osaka Prefecture. He graduated from the economics faculty of Keio University in 1944. He founded the Mitsuaki Corporation in 1946.

Political career
He was a public official in the Fuse City government from 1964 to 1966, and directed the merger to form Higashi-Osaka in 1966. In 1967, he was elected to the House of Representatives, representing the 4th District of Osaka.

Shiokawa served as Parliamentary Vice Minister of International Trade and Industry from 1972 to 1973, Deputy Chief Cabinet Secretary from 1976 to 1977, Commerce and Industry Committee Chairman from 1979 to 1980, Minister of Transport from 1980 to 1981 (under Prime Minister Zenko Suzuki), Minister of Education from 1986 to 1987 (under PM Yasuhiro Nakasone), Chief Cabinet Secretary for three months in 1989 (under PM Sōsuke Uno), and Minister of Home Affairs from 1991 to 1992.

Although Shiokawa became Secretary-General of the LDP in 1995, he lost his seat in the 1996 general elections, and was not re-elected until 2000.

In 2001, Junichiro Koizumi tapped Shiokawa to serve as Minister of Finance.  He resigned in 2003 and decided not to seek re-election that year.

Shiokawa was dean of Toyo University, director of the Kansai Shogi Hall, and active within the Japan Sumo Association.

Death
Shiokawa died  on September 20, 2015 of pneumonia in Osaka, Japan at the age of 93.

Honours
From the corresponding article in the Japanese Wikipedia

Grand Cordon of the Order of the Rising Sun
Conferred an Honorary Doctorate in Humanities from The University of Cambodia (2004)

Foreign honour
  : Honorary Commander of the Order of Loyalty to the Crown of Malaysia (P.S.M.) (2004)

References

External links

|-

|-

|-

|-

|-

|-

|-

|-

|-

|-

|-

1921 births
2015 deaths
Government ministers of Japan
Keio University alumni
Liberal Democratic Party (Japan) politicians
Members of the House of Representatives (Japan)
Ministers of Finance of Japan
People from Higashiōsaka
Deaths from pneumonia in Japan
Honorary Commanders of the Order of Loyalty to the Crown of Malaysia